Mignogna may refer to:

Eduardo Mignogna (1940–2006), Argentinian film director and screenwriter
Nicola Mignogna (1808–1870), Italian politician
Vic Mignogna (born 1963), American voice actor and musician

Italian-language surnames
English-language surnames